John Weckert (BA – University of Adelaide, Graduate Diploma in Computer Science – La Trobe University, Master of Arts – La Trobe University, Doctor of Philosophy – University of Melbourne) is an Australian philosopher who has been an influential figure in, and substantial contributor to the field of information and computer ethics.  He has published many books and journal articles outlining his research in this field.

He is the founder and editor-in-chief of the journal Nanoethics: Ethics for Technologies that Converge at the Nanoscale, as well as the Australian Computer Society (ACS) representative on the Technical Committee on Computers and Society.  He works closely with the ACS on various projects, including developing case studies to accompany the ACS Code of Ethics, with the case studies linking to clauses outlined in the CoE. He is also the manager of the Centre for Applied Philosophy and Public Ethics (CAPPE) Program on Emerging Technologies: IT and Nanotechnology at Charles Sturt University. He is currently the Senior Professor of Information Technology in the School of Information Studies at Charles Sturt University.

Education and profession

Qualifications
 Ph.D. University of Melbourne, 1985, Philosophy.
 Diploma of Computer Science, La Trobe University, 1985.
 M.A. La Trobe University, 1977, Philosophy.
 B.A. (Hons)(First class) University of Adelaide, 1974, Philosophy.

Positions held
 Professor of Computer Ethics, School of Humanities and social Sciences, Charles Sturt University
 Professorial Fellow, Centre for Applied Philosophy and Public Ethics, an ARC funded Special Research Centre
 2003–2006: Professor of Information Technology, School of Information Studies
 October – December 2006 – Erasmus Scholar NTNU, Trondheim, Norway and Linköping University, Sweden
 January – March 2004 – Visiting Professor of Philosophy, Dartmouth College, USA
 2000–2002: Associate Professor of Information Technology
 July 1991 –December 1999: Senior Lecturer in Information Technology
 September 1986 – July 1991: Lecturer in Computing, Charles Sturt University
 1985–86: Lecturer in Computing/Philosophy, Melbourne College of Advanced Education
 1977–84: Lecturer in Philosophy, Melbourne College of Advanced Education
 1976: Senior Tutor in Philosophy, University of Western Australia
 1975: Tutor in Philosophy, Monash University

Contributions to information ethics
Weckert has contributed many ideas to Information Ethics, specifically relative to the relationship between the philosophical and applied sides of Information and Computer Ethics.

Trust in an online environment
Weckert has done extensive research on the idea of trust within an online environment.  He sums up his theories in his 2005 article, "Trust in Cyberspace".

In the article, Weckert focuses on a few key issues regarding the concept of trust and if and when it may be possible in cyberspace. Trust has both cognitive and non-cognitive aspects: one may feel a certain way about another's trustworthiness without believing it in their mind. Trust opens one up to a degree of risk and is thus indispensable to friendship. Weckert opposes trust with monitoring by arguing that in order for trust to exist there must be limits on monitoring. He argues that a lack of community values or online social norms makes the internet less trustworthy but this obstacle may dissipate over time. He also addresses the hurdles that online anonymity and disembodiment put in front of online trust.

In terms of the effect trust has on the average person (or digital representation of a person) in an online environment, Weckert's ideas apply similarly.  He assesses some factors relevant to video gaming, where trust is often an issue, specifically when playing against human opponents.  In his 2005 article, he specifies some methods for obtaining online trust, and his second method focuses on how to do so in the context of e-commerce.  Near the end he mentions that developing trust in areas such as chat groups is not as much of a problem because not as much is at stake.  This is also true in some cases with respect to online gaming.  While gaming certainly does not place as much at stake as a financial transaction, players sometimes have a very strong connection to the game or some part of the game such as their avatar, and for this reason trust is an important factor for them within the game.

Trust in relation to cheating

Weckert's work with online trust also has significant implications on cheating.  Due to the increased sense of community and closeness associated with the establishment of trust in an online environment, occurrences of cheating are likely to decline.  In Mia Consalvo's 2007 article on gaining advantages in video games, she states that one sense of cheating can be defined as "violating the spirit of the game." The "spirit of the game" is less likely to be violated if each player in the virtual world has some type of trust that the others will respect the game in at least a similar sense to their own.  By definition, the spirit of the game would not be violated by the players (or at least minimally violated), therefore by definition this would mean that cheating would at least decline.

Other contributions
In addition to his work related to trust, Weckert has contributed to many other areas within Information and Computer Ethics.  Recently, he has begun research on the application of the precautionary principle to nanotechnology.  This research involves a careful analysis of the real and potential risks of developments in nanotechnology, as well as an examination of just what the precautionary principle is.

Publications
Weckert has published both books and scholarly journal entries.  This is an abridged version of the list of his work, as he has contributed to many other publications including guest editorships, book chapters, conferences, talks, and professional magazines.

Articles

 
 
 
 
 
 
 
 
 
 
 
 
 
  (reprinted in Robert K. Miller above).

Books
 
 
 
 
 
 
 Weckert, John; Al-Saggaf, Yeslam (eds), Selected papers from the Computers and Philosophy (CAP) conference, The Australian National University, 13 October – 2 November 2003. CRPIT, vol 37: Australian Computer Society, Sydney.
 
  (Proceedings of the Libraries and Expert Systems conference, Charles Sturt University – Riverina, July 1990).

See also
 Trust: Trust in an online environment
 Cheating: Cheating in an online environment

References

Australian philosophers
Living people
Academic staff of Charles Sturt University
University of Melbourne alumni
University of Adelaide alumni
La Trobe University alumni
Year of birth missing (living people)